Cam Burke (born April 30, 1987) is a Canadian amateur golfer.

Burke was born in Kitchener, Ontario. He attended Eastern Michigan University. He won the 2008 and 2009 Canadian Amateur Championship.

Burke played on the Web.com Tour in 2014 after earning his tour card through qualifying school but had little success and failed to retain his card.

Amateur wins (2)
2008 Canadian Amateur Championship
2009 Canadian Amateur Championship

Other accomplishments
 2010 Canadian Men's Amateur Team Member
 4th Place, 2009 National Men's Order of Merit of Canada
 1st Place, 2009 Ontario Men's Order of Merit
 Played at the 2009 RBC Canadian Open (CUT) 
 3rd place, 2009 Ontario Amateur
 Played at the 2008 U.S. Amateur Championship (CUT)
 5th place, 2008 National Men's Order of Merit of Canada
 Runner-up, 2008 Ontario Amateur
 Runner-up, 2008 Toronto Star Amateur
 1st Place, 2008 Ontario Men's Order of Merit
 Played at the 2006 U.S. Amateur Championship (CUT)
 3rd place, 2005 Canadian Junior Championship

Team appearances
Amateur
Eisenhower Trophy (representing Canada): 2010

References

External links
Profile on the Eastern Michigan University official site

Canadian male golfers
Golfing people from Ontario
Eastern Michigan University alumni
Sportspeople from Kitchener, Ontario
Canadian expatriates in the United States
1987 births
Living people